KX96 may refer to:
CKX-FM, in Brandon, Manitoba
CJKX-FM, in Ajax, Ontario